Gratien Gélinas,  (December 8, 1909 – March 16, 1999) was a Canadian writer, playwright, actor, director, producer and administrator who is considered one of the founders of modern Canadian theatre and film.

His major works include Tit-Coq (1948), Bousille et les Justes (1959), and Hier, les enfants dansaient (1968). He also wrote a series of satirical revues known as the Fridolinades.

The Fridolinades revues, consisting of comic sketches, songs, and monologues, were named for the often-featured character Fridolin. A poor boy from Montreal, he wore a tri-colour Canadiens hockey jersey, knee socks, and suspenders.  While not quite joual, the French he spoke was reflective of what a person would hear on the streets of Montreal, which made it stand out in sharp contrast to the continental French being spoken in most other theatres.  Fridolin's boundless optimism in the face of constant disappointment came to emblemize the Quebec spirit of "survivance", and made him one of the first distinctly Canadian heroes of the stage.  His success was considerable: Gélinas was declared by an adoring public to be the first playwright "de chez nous" (from our place).

Gélinas' play Hier, les enfants dansaient (Yesterday the Children were Dancing) takes place entirely in one night. Based in 1966, it revolves around the tumultuous politics in Quebec around that time though its characters are entirely fictitious. Pierre Gravel is debating whether or not to accept a prominent position within the Liberal party. Throughout the course of the play, Gravel's sons, André and Larry, admit that they are active members of the separatist party and responsible for the bombs that had been threatening the city and destroying historical landmarks.

Gélinas also founded the Comédie-Canadienne, which was active until 1972.

In 1967, Gélinas was made an Officer of the Order of Canada and was promoted to Companion in 1989. In 1985, he was made a Knight of the National Order of Quebec. He received an honorary doctorate from the Royal Military College of Canada in St-Jean in 1989.

He married Huguette Oligny in 1973 and is the grandfather of actor and pop singer Mitsou Gélinas, MusiquePlus veejay, writer and actor Abeille Gélinas, and writer Anne-Marie Sicotte who has written the biography  "Gratien Gélinas : la ferveur et le doute", published by the Éditions Québec/Amérique in 1995 et 1996. After his death in 1999, he was entombed at the Notre Dame des Neiges Cemetery in Montreal. The Library and Archives Canada contains sound recordings and transcriptions of Anne-Marie Sicotte's interview with Gelinas.

Filmography
La dame aux camélias, la vraie - 1942
Fridolinons - 1945
The Plouffe Family (La famille Plouffe) - 1953
Tit-Coq - 1953
Red - 1970
Cordélia - 1980
Peau de banane - 1982
Agnes of God - 1985
The Canadian Conspiracy - 1985
The Mills of Power (Les Tisserands du pouvoir) - 1988

References

External links

 
 Gratien Gélinas at The Canadian Encyclopedia
 Podcast on Gratien Gelinas from Library and Archives Canada
  Fonds Gratien Gélinas (R666) at Library and Archives Canada

1909 births
1999 deaths
Canadian male stage actors
Companions of the Order of Canada
Fellows of the Royal Society of Canada
Knights of the National Order of Quebec
Film directors from Quebec
20th-century Canadian dramatists and playwrights
Writers from Quebec
Male actors from Quebec
Canadian dramatists and playwrights in French
20th-century Canadian male actors
Canadian male dramatists and playwrights
Best Supporting Actor Genie and Canadian Screen Award winners
20th-century Canadian male writers
Burials at Notre Dame des Neiges Cemetery